10th Avenue, formerly known as Macario Asistio Sr. Avenue or simply Asistio Avenue, is an undivided four-lane street in Caloocan, Metro Manila, Philippines that stretches east–west, bisecting south Caloocan. Like most avenues in the Grace Park area, it crosses a grid system of numbered streets that run from north to south, with other numbered avenues running from east to west. 10th Avenue was formally renamed as "Asistio Avenue" prior to the reversion of its current name, owing to it being the tenth avenue running east–west from the city's border with Manila in the south. The former renaming was done in 1984 to honor the former mayor of Caloocan who served from 1962 to 1971 and the father of another Caloocan mayor Boy Asistio, but has since been disregarded and reverted.

10th Avenue and the present-day Grace Park district, through which it travels, was a pre–World War II civilian airfield known as the Manila North Airfield or Grace Park. This airfield, which opened in 1935 near the then-newly built Bonifacio Monument, was Manila's first commercial airport that served as a hub for Philippine Airlines for its first domestic routes. The airport was decommissioned after the war and was transformed by the government into a residential and industrial area.

Route description 

10th Avenue is a national road classified by the Department of Public Works and Highways as a tertiary road.

The avenue is divided into two segments by Rizal Avenue which also serves as the dividing line between Grace Park West and Grace Park East. At its western segment, 10th Avenue begins just east of the 10th Avenue railway station in Barangay 64 and curves slightly to the north before the intersection with Vibora Street and straightens out as it crosses several streets towards Rizal Avenue. Landmarks along this segment include the Caloocan public library, Caloocan High School and Caloocan City Science High School. East of Rizal Avenue, it runs in an almost perfectly straight line to its other terminus in Grace Park East. Located along this segment is the Caloocan campus of Systems Plus College Foundation. The New Caloocan City Hall is accessible via 8th and 9th Streets, a full block south of 10th Avenue.

At the avenue's west end, it continues as Padre Burgos Street through Caloocan's poblacion and Dagat-Dagatan districts, providing access to the Caloocan Judicial Complex, Caloocan Poblacion Market, Caloocan Central Elementary School, and the Caloocan Cathedral.

References 

Streets in Metro Manila